Lor mee is a Chinese Hokkien noodle dish from Zhangzhou served in a thick starchy gravy. Variants of the dish are also eaten by Hokkiens (Min Nan speakers) in Singapore, Indonesia, Malaysia and Thailand. In the Philippines, the local variant is called Lomi or Pancit Lomi. The thick gravy is made of corn starch, spices, meat, seafoods and eggs. The ingredients added into the noodles are usually ngo hiang, fish cake, fish, round and flat meat dumplings (usually chicken or pork), half a boiled egg, and other items depending on the stall and the price paid. Vinegar and garlic can be added as an optional item. Lor Mee can be served together with red chili. Traditional versions also include bits of fried fish as topping though few stalls serve this version anymore.

In Putian cuisine, lor mee is a much lighter dish usually prepared with less starch and seafood instead of meat.

Henan lumian 
In central China's Henan cuisine, the same characters are used for an unrelated dish of wheat noodles traditionally prepared with a labor-intensive process of steaming, stir-frying and then steaming again.

Although they are all thought to have descended from lor mee (卤面), a staple of Fujianese cooking.

See also

 Mie kuah
 Chinese Indonesian cuisine
 Hokkien mee, a series of Singaporean and Malaysian noodle dishes descended from Fujian lor mee
 Malaysian cuisine
 Singaporean cuisine
 Thai cuisine

References

Chinese noodle dishes
Burmese cuisine
Malaysian noodle dishes
Singaporean noodle dishes
Indonesian noodle dishes